Paul Battles (born September 4, 1947) is an American politician who served in the Georgia House of Representatives from the 15th district from 2009 to 2019.

References

1947 births
Living people
Republican Party members of the Georgia House of Representatives